Sundari is a 2021  Indian Tamil-language dramatic series starring Gabriella Sellus along with Jishnu Menon and Shreegopika Neelanath. It premiered on Sun TV on February 22, 2021. It is available for worldwide streaming on Sun NXT.

Plot
Sundari is the story of a girl who faces discrimination for her dark skin, yet she fights against adversities in life. She has a kind heart but struggles to find the right man to marry. Undeterred, she strives to become an IAS officer. Her journey towards achieving her goal takes her through many ups and downs in life and she firmly believes that inner beauty is more important than physical appearance, which forms the crux of the story. It is also about the story of fair-skinned urban girl, Anu, who is modern, empowered, and waiting for a loving and sincere partner. She does gets a loving husband, Kartik, but is not a sincere man who misuses and emotionally manipulates her love for his desires and fantasies on family life. It is also about Kartik, a man from a village of Sundari and her family person, who by relationship will be marrying her but is having an imagination and desire for fair-skinned woman for his family life. It's about his perception of men from his social background have about urban, fair-skinned, and empowered woman like Anu; and how they objectify them. Anu is made a scapegoat and invalidated to validate potential in village women, Sundari. She's not allowed to make her own decisions by scapegoating her over her health issues. However, Kartik is shown in a better light of wanting to have a family with Anu for her skin complexion that he also falls for her sincere love. Yet he is perverse and manipulates her for his selfish desires because of his fantasies.

Cast

Main
 Gabriella Sellus as Sundari Devi "Sundari" Karthikeyan: A dark-skinned girl who is a bright student. Kalyana Sundaram and Valliamma's daughter, Karthick's first wife and Siddhu's love interest, an aspiring woman to become an IAS officer
 Jishnu Menon as Karthikeyan "Karthick" Shankar: Shankar and Selvi's son, Lakshmi's younger brother, Anu and Sundari's husband.
 Shreegopika Neelanath as Anupriya "Anu" Karthikeyan: A fair-skinned girl who is good in studies. Karthick's girlfriend turned second wife, Malliga's adopted daughter. Sundari's MD and a good friend, rich businesswoman. Now she's pregnant.

Recurring
 Jay Srinivas as Siddharth "Sidhu": Sundari's classmate and a good friend also he had a crush on her.
 Niharika Harshu replacement Premi Venkat as Malliga Devi "Malliga": Anu's adoptive mom, a rich businesswoman
 Manohar Krishna replacement Satheesh Kumar replacement Manohar Krishna as Murugan Mamma: Lakshmi's husband and Karthick's brother-in-law, Malini's father 
 P. R. Varalakshmi as Gandhimathi : Sundari's paternal grandmother; Valliamma's mother-in-law
 Indumathy Manikandan as Valliamma: Sundari's mother
 "Jyothi" Minnal Deepa as Lakshmi: Karthick's elder sister and Murugan's wife, Malini's mother
 Sangeetha Balan as House owner Janaki a.k.a. Jaanu, Sundari's wellwisher
 Aravish Kumar as Krishnakanthan "Krishna", Karthick's best friend, Malini's husband.
 Arumpon Balaji as Kurangu Kumar 
 Deepthi Rajendran as Malini Murugan Krishnakanthan: Murugan and Lakshmi's daughter; Sundari's best friend, Karthick's niece, Krishna's wife.
 Lailaa as Sudhalakshmi "Sudha", Anu's housemaid
 Prithiksha Sankar as Nila, Janaki's granddaughter
 L. Raja as Sankarapandian "Shankar": Lakshmi and Karthick's father (deceased)
 Lakshmi Vasudevan replacement J. Lalitha as Selvi: Lakshmi and Karthick's mother
 Vigneshwaran as Arun: Malini's Ex-fiancé
 Hariharan as Dilli, Arun's friend
 Gracy Thangavel as Viji, Sundari's arch-rival 
 Sandhya Jagarlamudi as Radha: Murugan's niece
 Krithika Annamalai as ACP Geetha
 Arunkumar Padmanathan as Pazhani (deceased)

Special appearances
 Mime Gopi as Kalyana Sundaram: Sundari's father (2021) (Dead)
 Vaiyapuri as Kattam Kandhaswamy (2021)
 VJ Aswath as Himself (2022)
 Swetha Senthilkumar as Herself (2022)
 Rakesh KM as Himself (2022)
 Nila Gracy as Devi (2022)
 Tharani Suresh Kumar as Periyanayaki aka Berry
  Kausalya as Nandan Bharathi

Casting
The series is a family melodrama that airs on Sun TV. Gabriella Sellus was cast in the female lead role of Sundari, who previously appeared in the 2019 film Airaa and the fifth season of Kalakka Povathu Yaaru? (season 5). Kanmani serial fame Jishnu Menon was cast for the male lead role of Karthik. Shreegopika Neelanath was cast as second female lead role who previously known for her role in 90ML. Indumathy Manikandan, who appeared in the 2018 film Kadaikutty Singam and in the television series Thirumanam, was cast in a supporting role of Sundari's Mother. Minnal Deepa, known for her short, but crucial appearance in the meme Vaama Minnal in the film Maayi, and in the television series Yaaradi Nee Mohini, was cast in a supporting role. While Manohar Krishnan, Aravish, P. R. Varalakshmi, Premi Venkat and others were also selected for pivotal roles.

Viewership

Special episodes and crossovers
On March 31, 2021, it aired its first special episode for two hours named "Sundari-Karthick's Wedding"
On September 19, 2021, it aired a one-hour special episode revolving around Murugan, Lakshmi, Sundari, Karthick, Anu, Malliga, Krishna were in the same house and in a same situation, that named "Kannamoochi Aattam"
On January 2, 2022, it aired a two-hour nonstop special episode revolving around the truth revealing track named "Kaathirukum Athirchi"
 On July 12, 2021 – Aug 1, 2021, it had a crossover with Vanathai Pola.

Adaptations

References

External links 
 

Sun TV original programming
Tamil-language melodrama television series
2021 Tamil-language television series debuts
Tamil-language television series based on Kannada-language television series
Television shows set in Tamil Nadu
Tamil-language television soap operas